Mariela Rosana Montero Ríos (born September 27, 1980) is an Argentinian model, actress, singer and media celebrity figure. She became known for her participation in the Argentinian reality television show Gran Hermano 2007; and for the Chilean reality show Pelotón VIP in 2009.

Biography 
Mariela Montero was born in Salta, Argentina. She is the daughter of José Montero and Marta Ríos. She began to sing as a result of her father belonging to a folklore music group. During her teenage years she studied for five years in theatre workshops. She studied theatre teaching and visual arts in Salta.

Since 2009, after participating in the Chilean reality show Pelotón VIP, Montero has resided in Chile and is in a relationship with a Chilean named Rodrigo Roa, an architect of Concepción.

Career 
Before entering the house of Gran Hermano, Montero lived for a few years in the United States, where she studied English and acting and appeared in several telenovelas. She later moved to Italy, where she continued to study theatre and develop her taste for music.

On her return to Salta, Montero worked as a promoter and resumed acting classes with the teacher and theatre director Jorge Renoldi. She began to act in several plays with the theatre director Rafael Monti.

She rose to fame in 2007 for her participation in Gran Hermano 2007, where she was a finalist thanks to her low profile and her well defined character. Montero was eventually placed third, with 923,628 votes.

In September 2008, a band called Semilla Explosiva composed for her the song "Chica Clandestina" (Clandestine Girl). In November 2008 she released her first music album.

In 2009, She became known in Chile after she participated in the reality show of Televisión Nacional de Chile Pelotón VIP, in which all participants were subjected daily to strict military training. Thanks to her personality and good performance, she managed to win the hearts of viewers and thus become one of the favourites. During the same year she officially launched her music album in Chile in a bar, accompanied by her boyfriend Rodrigo Roa. During the album launch she said:

I always wanted to sing. I found myself and I did. In fact it's me who wrote the songs

Montero was then invited to participate in the Televisión Nacional de Chile programmes Animal Nocturno and Buenos Días a Todos; and Chilevisión's Primer Plano and Teatro en Chilevisión. She was a panelist of entertainment and showbusiness programme of Intrusos en la Televisión on La Red and in February 2010 was a candidate to be named Queen of the Festival of Viña del Mar.

In late September 2011, Montero returned to Argentina after she was contacted by Telefe to participate as a panelist in the debates of Gran Hermano 2012.

On June 18, 2012, she joined the panel of the La Red television programme Así Somos in Chile.

Television
 Gran Hermano 2007 Telefe - Argentina, 2007
 AM Telefe - Argentina, 2007-2008
 Intrusos en el Espectáculo América TV - Argentina, 2008
 Kubik América TV - Argentina, 2008
 Este es el Show El Trece - Argentina, 2008
 Don Francisco Presenta Univisión - United States, 2008
 Infama América TV - Argentina, 2009
 Pelotón VIP Televisión Nacional de Chile - Chile, 2009
 Animal nocturno Televisión Nacional de Chile - Chile, 2009
 Primer Plano Chilevisión - Chile, 2009
 Fiebre de baile 2 Chilevisión - Chile, 2009
 Combate estelar Televisión Nacional de Chile - Chile, 2009
 Teatro en Chilevisión Chilevisión - Chile, 2009–2010
 Intrusos en la televisión La Red - Chile, 2010
 Circo de estrellas (Chile) Televisión Nacional de Chile - Chile, 2010
 Gran Hermano 2012 Telefe - Argentina, 2011–2012
 Así Somos La Red - Chile, 2012
 Bienvenidos Canal 13 - Chile, 2012
 Mundos Opuestos 2 Canal 13 - Chile, 2013
 Ruleta Rusa Canal 13 - Chile, 2013
 En Portada UCV Televisión - Chile, 2013
 Juga2 Televisión Nacional de Chile - Chile, 2013

Music
 2008: Primer disco "100x100to yo!"
 "Chau". (Lucas M. Sanchez, Mariela Montero, Drieta D., Guevara A. y Olivieri Andress)
 "Estrellita Mía" (cover mexicano).
 "Gracias". (Lucas M. Sanchez, Mariela Montero, Drieta D., Guevara A. y Olivieri Andress)
 "Hoy". (Lucas M. Sanchez, Mariela Montero, Drieta D., Guevara A. y Olivieri Andress)
 "Escucha mi voz".

References

1980 births
Living people
People from Salta
Argentine female models
Argentine expatriates in Chile
Expatriate models in Chile
Glamour models
21st-century Argentine women singers
Argentine actresses